The following are space-related agencies, companies, and facilities in Virginia.

Northern Virginia

Government agencies
National Geospatial-Intelligence Agency
National Reconnaissance Office
National Security Space Office

Government contractors
Computer Sciences Corporation
GeoEye
Northrop Grumman 
Orbital Sciences Corporation
SAIC
t/Space

Civilian companies
Iridium Communications
SkyTerra
Space Adventures
SpaceQuest, Ltd.
TerreStar Corporation
Transmitter Location Systems

Hampton Roads

Government installations
NASA Langley Research Center
NASA Wallops Flight Facility

Commercial installations
Mid-Atlantic Regional Spaceport (MARS)

See also
List of companies headquartered in Northern Virginia
List of federal agencies in Northern Virginia

Virginia
Companies based in Virginia
Virginia-related lists